2007 Tour EP is a tour EP by Kevin Devine released during his 2007 U.S. tour opening for the bands Brand New and Manchester Orchestra. The EP contains mostly covers, along with a new version of "Wolf's Mouth" (originally from Make The Clocks Move) and an acoustic version of "You'll Only End Up Joining Them" (originally from Put Your Ghost to Rest).

The EP contains songs played during that tour. Three tracks ("Harvest Moon," "Holland, 1945," and "Wolf's Mouth") were included as bonus tracks on the vinyl release of Put Your Ghost to Rest. All the tracks from this EP later served as b-sides to the 2009 Splitting Up Christmas UK single.

This EP is currently out-of-print.

Track listing

2007 EPs
Kevin Devine EPs
Albums produced by Mike Skinner (musician)